Abike Funmilola Egbeniyi (born 23 October 1994) is a Nigerian athlete. She competed in the women's 4 × 400 metres relay event at the 2019 World Athletics Championships.

References

External links

1994 births
Living people
Nigerian female sprinters
Place of birth missing (living people)
World Athletics Championships athletes for Nigeria